The 2011 Santos Brasil Tennis Open was a professional tennis tournament played on clay courts. It was the first edition of the tournament which was part of the 2011 ATP Challenger Tour. It took place in Santos, Brazil between 18 and 24 April 2011.

Singles main draw entrants

Seeds

 Rankings are as of April 11, 2011.

Other entrants
The following players received wildcards into the singles main draw:
  Daniel Bustamante
  Daniel Dutra da Silva
  Christian Lindell
  José Pereira

The following players received entry into the singles main draw as a special exemption:
  Aljaž Bedene
  Marcelo Demoliner

The following players received entry from the qualifying draw:
  André Ghem
  Javier Martí
  Iván Miranda
  Yang Tsung-hua

Champions

Singles

 João Souza def.  Diego Junqueira, 6–4, 6–2

Doubles

 Franco Ferreiro /  André Sá def.  Gerald Melzer /  José Pereira, 6–3, 6–3

External links
ITF Search
ATP official site

Santos Brasil Tennis Open
Clay court tennis tournaments
Santos Brasil Tennis Open